Arturo López Rodríguez (born May 8, 1937) is a former professional baseball player. He played one season in Major League Baseball as an outfielder for the New York Yankees in 1965. He also played in Nippon Professional Baseball from 1968 until 1973.

During his lone major league season, López played in 38 games in his one-year career. Lopez had seven hits in 49 at-bats, a .143 batting average. His greater success came in Japan's NPB, where he played for six seasons. In those seasons he batted .290 with 116 home runs. He was an All-Star in 1968, and played in the Japan Series in 1970 for the Lotte Orions.

See also
 List of Major League Baseball players from Puerto Rico

References

External links

1937 births
Living people
Auburn Yankees players
Fort Lauderdale Yankees players
Greensboro Yankees players
Harlan Smokies players
Lotte Orions players
Major League Baseball left fielders
Major League Baseball players from Puerto Rico
Major League Baseball right fielders
New Jersey City Gothic Knights baseball players
New York Yankees players
Nippon Professional Baseball outfielders
People from Mayagüez, Puerto Rico
Puerto Rican expatriate baseball players in Japan
Richmond Virginians (minor league) players
Syracuse Chiefs players
Toledo Mud Hens players
Tokyo Orions players
Yakult Atoms players